Ashbaugh is a surname. Notable people with the surname include:

David R. Ashbaugh (born 1946), Canadian police officer known for his extensive research on the friction ridge identification
Dennis Ashbaugh (born 1946), American painter and artist from New York
Russell "Busty" Ashbaugh (1889–1953), football player at Brown University
Russell "Pete" Ashbaugh (born 1922), football standout at the University of Notre Dame